"'Hold Tight'" is a song written and composed by David Gates, and originally recorded by the pop-rock group Bread, of which Gates was the leader and primary music producer. It is a track from Bread's final LP, Lost Without Your Love from 1977.

Vicki Sue Robinson cover
"Hold Tight" was covered by American actress and singer Vicki Sue Robinson in the summer of 1977. 
The single peaked at #67 on the U.S. Billboard Hot 100 during the summer of 1977.  It was also a major dance hit, reaching #2.  The song did not chart outside the U.S. It preceded the release of the album on which it was included, her 1978 LP Half And Half.

Chart performance

Other versions
 Shaun Cassidy recorded "Hold Tight" as a live performance version. It was included as a track on the extended version of his 1979 LP, That's Rock 'n' Roll Live.

References

External links
 Lyrics of this song
 
 

1976 songs
1977 singles
Bread (band) songs
Vicki Sue Robinson songs
Songs written by David Gates
RCA Victor singles